Casey's June beetle, Dinacoma caseyi, is a beetle in the scarab family (Scarabaeidae). It is listed as an endangered species with approximately 587 acres (237 hectares) of land as critical habitat in Riverside County, California.

Taxonomy
Delbert La Rue, a researcher experienced with the genus Dinacoma and a taxonomic expert stated, "Dinacoma caseyi is a distinct species morphologically and comprises its own species group—the caseyi complex—the other [species group] being the marginata complex which includes the bulk/remainder of the genus". The Casey's June beetle was first collected in the city of Palm Springs, California, in 1916, and was later described by  based on male specimens. This species measures 0.55 to 0.71 inches (in) (1.4 to 1.8 centimeters (cm)) long, with dusty brown or whitish coloring, and brown and cream longitudinal stripes on the elytra (wing covers and back).

Biology
Based on surveys conducted to assess the species' presence, both male and female Casey's June beetles emerge from burrows in the alluvial sand sometime between late March and early June, with abundance peaks generally occurring in April and May. Females are always observed on the ground and are considered flightless.  stated that "Female Dinacoma are very rare in collections. Females display an accentuated sexual dimorphism characterized by an enlarged abdomen, reduced legs and antennae, and metathoracic wing reduction and venation. These characters are likely adaptations to flightlessness and a fossorial biology." During the active flight season, males emerge from the ground and begin flying near dusk. Males are reported to fly back and forth or crawl on the ground where a female beetle has been detected.  theorized that after emergence, females remain on the ground and release pheromones to attract flying males. After mating, females return to their burrows or dig a new burrow and deposit eggs. Excavations of adult emergence burrows revealed pupal exuviae (casings) at depths ranging from approximately 4 to 6 in (10 to 16 cm).

The larval cycle for the species is likely one year, based on the absence of larvae (grubs) in burrows during the adult flight season. The food source for Casey's June beetle larvae while underground is unknown, but other species of June beetle are known to eat "plant roots or plant detritus and associated decay organisms".  stated, "[Casey's June beetle] exhibits no specific host preferences, and larvae likely consume any available organic resources— including [layered organic debris]— encountered within the alluvial habitat." Specific host plant associations for Casey’s June beetle are not known. Although visual surveys have detected a concentration of emergence burrows in the vicinity of a number of species of woody shrub in Palm Canyon Wash, this may be due to low soil disturbance by vehicles, foot traffic, and horses near woody vegetation.

Notes

References

 Cited in 

 Cited in 
 Cited in 

 Cited in 
. Cited in 

Beetles of North America
Melolonthinae
Endemic fauna of California
Fauna of the Colorado Desert
Fauna of Riverside County, California
Endangered fauna of California
Beetles described in 1930
ESA endangered species